Test 219 was a nuclear test conducted by the Soviet Union in the atmosphere via ICBM. The test was performed on December 24, 1962 over the Novaya Zemlya test range. It exploded at height of 2.33 mi (3.75 km).

References

Soviet nuclear weapons testing
1962 in Russia
1962 in military history
Explosions in 1962
December 1962 events
Novaya Zemlya